Marie Jeanne Clemens (née Crévoisier, 16 November 1755 – 20 March 1791) was a French-Danish painter, engraver and pastel artist.

She was the daughter of the clock maker Claude Joseph Crévoisier and his wife Marie Thérèse (Blot) in Paris. From 1773 she was the student and from 1781 the spouse of the Danish artist Johan Frederik Clemens, with whom she moved to Denmark after their wedding.

She was inducted as one of its first female members to the Danish Academy of Fine Arts in 1782.

In 1788, she moved to Berlin, where she died of consumption (tuberculosis) in 1791. She was also a member of the Berlin Academy.

References 

1755 births
1791 deaths
18th-century Danish painters
18th-century French painters
18th-century Danish engravers
18th-century deaths from tuberculosis
18th-century Danish women artists
18th-century French women artists
Painters from Paris
Danish people of French descent
Royal Danish Academy of Fine Arts alumni
18th-century Danish printmakers
Danish women painters
French women painters
Prussian Academy of Arts alumni
Women engravers
Pastel artists
Tuberculosis deaths in Germany
Danish women printmakers
French women printmakers